The Women's snowboard slopestyle competition at the FIS Freestyle Ski and Snowboarding World Championships 2023 was held on 27 February 2023.

Qualification
The qualification was started at 10:00. The twelve best snowboarders qualified for the final.

Final
The final was started at 13:45.

References

Women's snowboard slopestyle